Mission San Francisco de la Espada (also Mission Espada) is a Roman Rite Catholic mission established in 1690 by Spain and relocated in 1731 to present-day San Antonio, Texas, in what was then known as northern New Spain. The mission was built in order to convert local Native Americans to Christianity and solidify Spanish territorial claims in the New World against encroachment from France. Today, the structure is one of four missions that comprise San Antonio Missions National Historical Park.

History
Founded in 1690 as San Francisco de los Tejas near Weches, Texas and southwest of present-day Alto, Texas, Mission San Francisco de la Espada was the second mission established in Texas.

Three priests, three soldiers and supplies were left among the Nabedache Indians. The new mission was dedicated on June 1, 1690. A smallpox epidemic in the winter of 1690-1691 killed an estimated 3,300 people in the area. The Nabedache believed the Spaniards brought the disease and hostilities developed between the two groups.

Drought besieged the mission in the summers of 1691 and 1692, and the Nabedache wished to get rid of the mission. Under threat of personal attack, the priests began packing their belongings in the fall of 1693. On October 25, 1693, the padres burned the mission and retreated toward Monclova. The party lost its way and did not reach Monclova until February 17, 1694.

The mission was re-established in the same area on July 5, 1716 by the Domingo Ramón-St. Denis expedition. It was named as Nuestro Padre San Francisco de los Tejas. The new mission had to be abandoned in 1719 because of conflict between Spain and France.

The mission was tried once more on August 5, 1721 as San Francisco de los Neches. As the Nabedache were no longer interested in the mission, and France had abandoned effort to lay claim in the area, the mission was temporarily relocated along the Colorado River in July 1730. Mission Tejas State Park encompasses the original site of the mission.

The mission relocated to its current location in the San Antonio River area (coordinates 29.3177°, -98.4498°) in March, 1731 and was renamed San Francisco De la Espada. A friary was built in 1745, and the church was completed in 1756.  The relocation was in part inspired by fears of French encroachment and need for more Missionaries to tend to San Antonio de Bexar's Indian population.  The Mission encountered great difficulties in presiding over the Indian population and experienced common rebellious activity.

Several modern churches have been architecturally based on the design of this mission including St. Stephen's Episcopal Church in Wimberley, Texas, north of San Antonio.

Rancho de las Cabras 
Rancho de las Cabras was established between 1750 and 1760, 30 miles southeast of San Antonio de Bexar under the jurisdiction of Mission Espada, so as to provide land for cultivation of crops and livestock for the Mission's population without intruding on private lands.  The ranch was primarily made up by low fences and thatched buildings known as jacales for the native workforce to inhabit. According to Ethno-Historian T.N. Campbell, the ranch was likely constructed by Indians not native to Texas. It is listed separately as part of the World Heritage Site.

Espada Acequia

Mission San Francisco de la Espada's acequia and aqueduct can still be seen today. The main ditch continues to carry water to the mission and its former farm lands. This water is still used by residents living on these neighboring lands.

The use of acequias was originally brought to the arid regions of Spain and Portugal by the Romans and the Moors. When Franciscans missionaries arrived in the desert Southwest they found the system worked well in the hot, dry environment.

Gallery

See also
Spanish missions in Texas
Mission Nuestra Señora de la Purísima Concepción de Acuña; also Mission Concepcion
Mission San José y San Miguel de Aguayo
Mission San Juan Capistrano
Espada Acequia
Mission Tejas State Park

References

"Mission San Francisco de la Espada". National Park Service. Retrieved July 12, 2005.
"Interpretive Guide to Mission Tejas State Park". Texas Parks and Wildlife. 2006.

San Francisco de la Espada
San Antonio Missions National Historical Park
Churches completed in the 1690s
National Register of Historic Places in San Antonio
Properties of religious function on the National Register of Historic Places in Texas
San Antonio Missions (World Heritage Site)
1690 establishments in New Spain
1690 establishments in Texas
17th-century architecture in Mexico
Spanish Colonial architecture in Texas